Nicholas Christos Petris (February 25, 1923 – March 20, 2013) was a California State Senator from 1966 until 1996. A Democrat, he represented the 11th district from 1966 to 1976 and the 9th district from 1976 until he was termed out in 1996. He was previously in the California State Assembly, representing the 15th district from 1958 until 1966.

Personal life and education
Petris was born in Oakland, California. He received his Bachelor's degree from University of California, Berkeley and his law degree from Stanford Law School. He was classmates and friends with Warren Christopher, Secretary of State under President Bill Clinton. 
During the late 1960s and early 1970s, when Greece was governed by a dictatorship, he took a stand against it as an honorary Chairman of the California Committee for Democracy in Greece.

Legislative career 
Petris dedicated substantial energy and resources toward expanding the University of California system. Petris was also the co-author of the Lanterman-Petris-Short Act, which brought changes to the mental health system in California. He was a supporter and advocate of Save The Bay, a nonprofit organization that was successful in restricting and managing land development around the San Francisco Bay. He was a co-sponsor of the McAteer-Petris Act which established and governs operations of the San Francisco Bay Conservation and Development Commission (BCDC).

He introduced bills to ban DDT and to limit cars to one per family, but neither was passed.

Legacy
Locations named after Petris include:
 The Nicholas C. Petris Center on Health Care Markets & Consumer Welfare at UC Berkeley
 The Nicholas C. Petris Lecture (started in 2001) at San Francisco State University
 The California Department of Transportation Building at 111 Grand Ave., Oakland, CA.

References

External links
Join California Nicholas C. Petris

1923 births
2013 deaths
Lawyers from Oakland, California
Democratic Party California state senators
Democratic Party members of the California State Assembly
Politicians from Oakland, California
Stanford Law School alumni
University of California, Berkeley alumni
20th-century American lawyers
People of the Office of Strategic Services